Armchair Gurus is a compilation album by Australian rock group Hoodoo Gurus. It was originally released as a 2-CD set with Electric Chair. The album features seventeen Hoodoo Gurus' ballads and slower songs. The album peaked at number 33 on the ARIA charts and was certified gold.

Track listing 
 "I'm Doing Fine" - 3:31
 "My Girl" - 2:39
 "Death Defying" - 3:24
 "Come On" - 2:43
 "Shadow Me" - 3:39
 "1000 Miles Away" - 4:27
 "Fading Slow" - 4:16
 "Night Must Fall" - 4:07
 "Judgement Day" - 3:12
 "My Caravan" - 4:15
 "Nobody" - 4:23
 "Lover for a Friend" - 3:37
 "Waking Up Tired" - 2:54
 "Zanzibar" - 3:25
 "Show Some Emotion" - 2:58
 "I Was The One" - 4:10
 "Castles in the Air" - 4:06

Charts

Certifications

References 

1997 compilation albums
Hoodoo Gurus albums
Compilation albums by Australian artists